Transformers: Prime is a computer animated television series which premiered on November 29, 2010, on Hub Network, Hasbro's and Discovery's joint venture, which began broadcasting on October 10, 2010, in the United States. The series was also previewed on Hub Network on November 26, 2010, as a one-hour special. Transformers: Prime was renewed for a second season, which premiered on February 18, 2012, also on Hub Network. The third and final season premiered on March 22, 2013.

Series overview

Episodes

Season 1 (2010–11)

Season 2 (2012)

Season 3: Beast Hunters (2013)

TV movie

References

Prime
Lists of American children's animated television series episodes